Demak is on the north coast of Central Java province, on the island of Java, Indonesia.

 Demak, Demak, modern-day large town
 Demak Sultanate, sixteenth century sultanate
 Demak Regency, modern-day regency around the town